Lithium succinate (C4H4Li2O4), the dilithium salt of succinic acid, is a drug used in the treatment of seborrhoeic dermatitis and proposed for the treatment of anogenital warts.

References

External links 
 

Lithium salts
Organolithium compounds
Succinates